Sacra Corona may refer to:

 Holy Crown of Hungary, playing an important role in the history of the Kingdom of Hungary, going as far as obtaining legal personhood
Sacra Corona Unita, an Italian criminal organization